"Never Be the Same" is the second single by Christian rock band Red from their second album, Innocence & Instinct. The single was released to Christian radio on December 12, 2008. It appears on WOW Hits 2010.

Background and meaning 
Vocalist Michael Barnes explained to NewReleaseTuesday, that this song "is told from the perspective of people who have a relationship with God." He added: "Even though all of us have gone through difficult situations, when we look to God and see how He's put us back together again and made us whole, we realize we'll never be the same. This song is an anthem of redemption. It's about thanking God for helping you and changing your life forever!"

Charts

References

External links 
 "Never Be the Same" at AllMusic

2008 songs
Red (American band) songs
Songs written by Jasen Rauch
Songs written by Rob Graves
Songs written by Bernie Herms
Songs written by Jason McArthur
Sony Music singles